The  Uruguay marked gecko (Homonota uruguayensis) is a species of gecko. It lives in Uruguay and southernmost Brazil (Rio Grande do Sul).

References

Homonota
Reptiles of Brazil
Reptiles of Uruguay
Reptiles described in 1961